La boda de mi mejor amigo is a 2019 Mexican drama film directed by Celso García that premiered on 14 February 2019. It is an adaptation of the 1997 American film My Best Friend's Wedding. The film stars Ana Serradilla, Carlos Ferro, Miguel Ángel Silvestre, and Natasha Dupeyrón.

Cast 
 Ana Serradilla as Julia
 Carlos Ferro as Manuel
 Miguel Ángel Silvestre as Jorge
 Natasha Dupeyrón as Pamela
 Patricia Bernal
 Paco Rueda as Cocinero
 Minnie West as Tammi

References

External links 
 

Mexican drama films
2010s Spanish-language films